The Flying Legend Hawker Hurricane Replica is an Italian light-sport aircraft, designed and produced by Flying Legend of Caltagirone and introduced at the AERO Friedrichshafen show in 2011. The aircraft, a 72% scale replica of the British Hawker Hurricane Second World War fighter, was supplied as a kit for amateur construction or as a complete ready-to-fly-aircraft.

Flying Legend is a collaborative project between MGA and Barum.

Design and development
After the initial showing in 2011, the aircraft's design was improved and a new model introduced in 2015 and kit production commenced.

The Hurricane Replica features a cantilever low-wing, a two-seats-in-tandem enclosed cockpit, retractable conventional landing gear and a single engine in tractor configuration.

The aircraft is made from welded 4130 steel tubing, sheet 2024-T3 aluminum and wood. Standard engines available are the  Rotax 912ULS four-stroke powerplant, with the  Rotax 914 and  D-Motor LF39 optional.

Specifications (Hawker Hurricane Replica)

References

External links
Official website

Hurricane
Homebuilt aircraft
Light-sport aircraft
Single-engined tractor aircraft
Low-wing aircraft
Replica aircraft
Hawker Hurricane